Alimosho is a Local Government Area in Lagos State, Nigeria with the largest population of about 3,082,900 which is according to Population [2019] – Projection The 2006 Census says the population was 1,288,714 (but the Lagos State Government argued that the population as at 2006 within the LGA was more than 2 million residents).

It has now been subdivided between several Local Community Development Areas (LCDA). The LCDA restructuring kicked off after the administration of Bola Ilori, who was the last chairman of the old single Alimosho Local Government. The six sub-divisions created out of the old Alimosho are: Agbado/Oke-odo LCDA, Ayobo/Ipaja LCDA, Alimosho LG, Egbe/Idimu LCDA, Ikotun/Igando LCDA and Mosan Okunola LCDA. The LGA contains the urban area of Egbeda/Akowonjo.

The Alimosho was established in 1945 and it was under the (then) western region. Alimosho's population is predominantly Egbados. The area is rich in culture, prominent amongst which are the Oro, Igunnu and Egungun annual festivals. The two main religions are Islam and Christianity. Yoruba language is widely spoken in the community.

The first secretariat of Alimosho is a two-storey building located on Council street, now in the Egbe/Idimu LCDA. it i s said that the LGA is the noisiest in Lagos State.

Gallery

References

External links 
 Alimosho Local Government

Neighborhoods of Lagos
Local Government Areas in Lagos State
Local Government Areas in Yorubaland